= Termark Technical Institute =

Termark Technical Institute is a privately held continuing education institution based in Coral Springs, Florida. The school provides training for low voltage electrical contractors, electronic security specialists as well as individuals preparing for certification and Federal Communications Commission (FCC) examinations. The school currently holds licensure with the State of Florida (PVD377) as well as Georgia, North Carolina, and Tennessee. Authorization is pending in New Jersey, Alabama and Texas. The school maintains professional memberships in IACET, ITEA, ACTE and FACTE.

Termark Technical Institute is a Certification Administrator with the Electronics Technicians Association International as a Certified Electronics Technician Examiner and FCC Commercial Radio License Examiner.
